The following highways are numbered 6A:

United States
 U.S. Route 6A (Connecticut) (former)
 U.S. Route 6A (Rhode Island)
 Route 6A (southern New England) (former)
 Route 6A (northern New England) (former)
 Massachusetts Route 6A
 Nevada State Route 6A (former)
 County Route 6A (Monmouth County, New Jersey)
 New York State Route 6A (former)
 County Route 6A (Oneida County, New York)
 County Route 6A (Ulster County, New York)